Njala means several things:

 Njáls saga, a well-known Icelandic saga,
 Njala, Moyamba, a city in Sierra Leone
 Njala, Bo, a city in Sierra Leone